The 1921–22 season was the 3rd official season of Beşiktaş J.K. After the İstanbul Sports League was canceled, Beşiktaş played in the İstanbul Sunday League for one season, because it would also be the last year of the Ottoman Empire. Beşiktaş competed along with 6 other teams.

Season

External links
http://www.angelfire.com/nj/sivritepe/5758/artlIST.html

Beşiktaş J.K. seasons